Meacham is a village in the Canadian province of Saskatchewan within the Rural Municipality of Colonsay No. 342 and Census Division No. 11. It is located 69 kilometres east of the City of Saskatoon on Highway 2.

History 
Meacham incorporated as a village on June 19, 1912.

Demographics 

Arts and culture 
The village is home to Dancing Sky Theater, which has produced Canadian plays in Meacham since 1997. The theater has launched many original productions, and has mounted tours for 10 of its shows.

See also 
 List of communities in Saskatchewan
 Villages of Saskatchewan

References

Villages in Saskatchewan
Colonsay No. 342, Saskatchewan
Division No. 11, Saskatchewan